Greatest Hits is the first "greatest hits" collection from American singer and songwriter Jody Watley. Executive-produced by Watley, the album highlights her MCA years (1987–1994) and contains all of her well-known pop hits, among them "Looking for a New Love", "Real Love" and "Everything"; two of Watley's classics, "Don't You Want Me" and "Some Kind of Lover", were presented in their more familiar remixed forms. Additionally, Watley (who compiled the collection with Andy McKaie) took care to include lesser-known songs like "Still a Thrill" and "Most of All".

Track listing
 "Looking for a New Love"  (André Cymone, Jody Watley)  (Single Mix)
 "I Want You"  (Cymone, Watley) 
 "Some Kind of Lover"  (Cymone, Watley)  (Dance Remix)
 "Friends"  (Cymone, Watley, Eric Barrier, William Griffin) 
 "Still a Thrill"   (Cymone, Watley) 
 "Everything"  (Gardner Cole, James Newton Howard) 
 "Don't You Want Me"  (Franne Golde, David Paul Bryant, Watley)  (Dance Remix)
 "Your Love Keeps Working on Me"  (John Barnes, Joey Diggs, Robert White) 
 "Most of All"  (Pat Leonard, Cole) 
 "I'm the One You Need"  (Watley, David Morales, Alec Shantzis) 
 "Ecstasy"  (Watley, Morales, Terry Burrus)  (Extended Dance Remix)
 "When a Man Loves a Woman"  (Larry Campbell, Watley)  (PM Dawn Remix)
 "Real Love"  (Cymone, Watley)

Credits
Compilation: Jody Watley, Andy McKaie
Art Direction: Vartan
Photo research: Geary Chansley
Photography: Guzman, Herb Ritts, Steven Meisel, Victoria Pearson

References

Jody Watley albums
1996 greatest hits albums
Albums produced by Bernard Edwards
Albums produced by André Cymone
MCA Records compilation albums